NGC 4206 is a spiral galaxy located about 70 million light-years away from Earth in the constellation of Virgo. The galaxy is visible with most moderate amateur telescopes at 13th magnitude. It was discovered by British astronomer William Herschel on 17 April 1784 and is a member of the Virgo Cluster.

References

External links 
 

4206
Virgo (constellation)
07260
IC objects
39183
17840417
Unbarred spiral galaxies
Virgo Cluster